Hoshang Dinshaw Merchant (born 1947) is a poet from India. Most of his writings are in English. He is best known for his anthology on gay writing titled Yaarana.

Early years and education
Hoshang Merchant was born in 1947 to a working class Zoroastrian family in Mumbai, India. He was educated at Xavier's Lads Academy and St. Xavier's College, Mumbai. He has a Masters from Occidental College, Los Angeles. At Purdue, he studied Renaissance and Modernism, and for his PhD (1981), wrote a dissertation on Anaïs Nin. He has lived and taught in Heidelberg, Jerusalem and Iran where he was exposed to various radical movements of the Left. Merchant is openly gay.

Writers Workshop in Kolkata, India has published seventeen books of his poetry since 1989. Rupa and Co. published his book of poems Flower to Flame in 1992 in the New Poetry in India series. The Rockefeller got him Bellagio Blues (2004). Yaraana: Gay Writing from India (Penguin, 1999), Forbidden Sex/Texts (Routledge, 2009), Indian Homosexuality (Allied, 2010), The Man Who Would Be Queen: Autobiographical Fiction (Penguin, 2012) and Sufiana: Poems (2013) are among his notable works.

Teacher, poet and critic
Since the mid-80s, Hoshang Merchant has made his home in Hyderabad, where he taught English at University of Hyderabad.

He has written 20 books of poetry, and four critical studies. He edited India's first gay anthology Yaraana: Gay Writing from India. Secret Writings of Hoshang Merchant (OUP: New Delhi, 2016), edited by Akshaya K. Rath, is his most recent publication.

Works

Poetry

 Flower to Flame (1989, Delhi: Rupa & Co.)
 Stone to Fruit (1989, Calcutta: Writers Workshop)
Yusuf in Memphis (1991, Calcutta: Writers Workshop)
Hotel Golkonda: Poems 1991 (1992, Calcutta: Writers Workshop)
The Home, the Friend and the World (1995, Calcutta: Writers Workshop)
Jonah and the Whale (1995, Calcutta: Writers Workshop)
Love's Permission (1996, Calcutta: Writers Workshop)
The Heart in Hiding (1996, Calcutta: Writers Workshop)
The Birdless Cage (1997, Calcutta: Writers Workshop)
Talking to the Djinns (1997, Calcutta: Writers Workshop)
Selected Poems (1999, Calcutta: Writers Workshop)
Bellagio Blues (2004, Hyderabad: Otherwise Books, Spark-India)
Homage to Jibanananda Das (2005, Contemporary World Poetry Series, London: Aark Arts)

Critical studies
In-discretions: Anaïs Nin (1990, Calcutta: Writers Workshop)
Forbidden Sex, Forbidden Texts (2008, Delhi: Routledge)

Edited
Yaarana: Gay Writing from India (1999, New Delhi: Penguin)

Appearances in the following poetry Anthologies 
 Anthology of Contemporary Indian Poetry (2004) ed. by Menka Shivdasani and published by Michael Rothenberg, Big Bridge United States.

See also

Indian English Poetry
Indian poetry in English

References

External links
 Hoshang Merchant: A Critical Biography by Bhaskar Lama
 Hoshang Merchant: Poet, Teacher, Lover
 "Sar Pe Lal Topi Parsi" by Hoshang Merchant, Outlook.com, 20 August 2001, accessed 27 October 2009
 "Hoshang Merchant - The Poetry of Jalwah" by Aparajita Roy Sinha, Channel6magazine.com, accessed 27 October 2009

1947 births
Living people
English-language poets from India
Gay poets
20th-century Indian poets
Indian expatriates in Iran
Indian expatriates in Israel
Indian expatriates in the United States
Indian male poets
Indian LGBT poets
LGBT Zoroastrians
Occidental College alumni
Parsi people from Mumbai
Poets from Maharashtra
Writers from Mumbai
Purdue University alumni
St. Xavier's College, Mumbai alumni
20th-century Indian male writers